María Vallejo-Nágera or María Vallejo-Nágera Zóbel (born May 6, 1964) is a successful novelist in Spanish.

Life 
Vallejo-Nágera was born in Madrid in 1964 as the third daughter of the writer  and María Victoria Zóbel de Ayala y Pfitz. Her grandfather is the controversial Antonio Vallejo-Nájera. Her family is an important one in the Philippines. She is the cousin of Samantha and Nicolás Vallejo-Nágera "Colate", and niece of the painter Fernando Zóbel. She studied at the Colegio de Nuestra Señora de los Rosales, before going on to study teaching at Complutense University in four rather than the usual five years.

Shortly after she married and had two twin daughters: Beatriz and Cristina, her husband's work took them to London. She used her time there writing children's stories. In the winter of 1997, while she was pregnant with her third son Gonzalo, she began writing her first novel In an Andalusian corner.  When she finished it, she looked for a place to publish it and sent it to the Premio Planeta de Novela with the idea of going to the publishing house afterwards to ask for advice on how to improve it. Surprisingly the novel was selected as a finalist from four hundred submissions, being fifth in the final vote.

In parallel with these events Vallejo-Nagera visited Medjugorje where she reported that she had received a re-conversion to the Catholic faith. She had been brought up as a Catholic but had moved away as she grew older. She reported later that this was a single spiritual event on 8 May 1999 although it was six months before she admitted it to a priest as she was worried that people might question her sanity.

To prepare the publication of her book Women of Light , Maria attended a master's degree in leadership for people over fifty and three courses in theology and early Christianity at Harvard University.

Selected works 

 In an Andalusian corner, 2000
 Black Moon: The light of Father Pateras, Barcelona, Belacqua, 2000
 The punishment of the angels, Barcelona, Planet, 2001
 A messenger at night: A chilling story based on a real event, Barcelona, Belacqua, 2003
 The nurse, Barcelona, Editions B, 2005
 The courtyard of silences, Barcelona, Styria, 2005
 Between the sky and the earth. Curious stories of purgatory. Barcelona, Planet, 2007
 Mala Tierra, Madrid, Citadel, 2009
 Lola Torbellino, Barcelona, Editions B, 2010
 Lola Whirlwind on the beach, Barcelona, Editions B, 2011
 Heaven and hell: truths of God, Madrid, Free Books, 2012
 From María to María: Puerta del cielo, Madrid, Word, 2014
 La Nodriza, 2014
 Juana Girl: The mystery of Cubas de la Sagra, Madrid, The sphere of Books, 2016
 Women of light, Barcelona, The sphere of books, 2018
 Walking through the sky, Madrid, Word, 2019

References

1964 births
Living people
People from Madrid
21st-century Spanish writers
21st-century Spanish women writers
Harvard Divinity School alumni